Arhopala agaba, the purple-glazed oakblue, (sometimes placed in Amblypodia) is a small butterfly found from India to Thailand, Langkawi, Indochina, Peninsular Malaysia to the Philippines and Sumatra that belongs to the lycaenids or blues family. The species was first described by William Chapman Hewitson in 1862.

Range
The butterfly occurs in India from Manipur to northern Myanmar and from Karens to southern Myanmar. It is not rare from Karens to southern Myanmar, but rare elsewhere.

See also
Lycaenidae
List of butterflies of India (Lycaenidae)

References
 
 
 
 

Notes

External links
 With images.

Arhopala
Butterflies of Asia
Taxa named by William Chapman Hewitson
Butterflies described in 1862